The 2011 Southern Conference baseball tournament was held at Joseph P. Riley Jr. Park in Charleston, South Carolina, from May 25 through 29.  Fourth seeded  won the tournament and earned the Southern Conference's automatic bid to the 2011 NCAA Division I baseball tournament. It was Georgia Southern's fifth SoCon tournament win and second in three years.

The tournament used a double-elimination format.  Only the top eight teams participate, so Wofford, Davidson, and The Citadel were not in the field.

Seeding

Brackets

Bracket One

Bracket Two

Final

Game Summaries

Round One

Round Two

Round Three

Semifinals

Championship final

All-Tournament Team

References

SoCon Tournament
Southern Conference Baseball Tournament
Southern Conference Tournament
Southern Conference baseball tournament